Mario Kasun (born April 5, 1980) is a Croatian former professional basketball player. He played at the center position.

Professional career
Kasun started playing basketball at a local club in Delnice when he was 14, before he started playing professionally with BC Zrinjevac in Zagreb. He was part of the 1998–99 Croatian junior team and the Croatian under-21 team in 2000.

After two seasons in the Zagreb club, and winning the Croatian Cup, in 2000 he moved to Gonzaga University in the NCAA, but was subsequently suspended by the Croatian Basketball Federation for this abrupt move, and spent two seasons on the bench.

Kasun played at 2002 NBA pre-draft camp in Chicago, being one of the tallest players, and showing some center skills. During 50 minutes over three games, he totalled 20 points and had 14 rebounds and six blocked shots, converting nine of 17 shots (52.9%). In 2002, he was initially selected by the National Basketball Association's (NBA) Los Angeles Clippers in the second round (41st overall) of the 2002 NBA draft. On June 26, he was traded by the Clippers to the Orlando Magic in exchange for future considerations. Regardless of this, he then moved to Germany to play for the Deutsche Bank Skyliners, based in Frankfurt. With them he won the German championship and also appeared in the 2003–04 ULEB Cup.

In 2004, he returned to the US to play for the Orlando Magic. In the 2004–05 season he played in 45 games for Orlando and averaged 7.9 minutes per game. In 2005–06, he appeared in 28 games. Kasun's final NBA game was played on March 4, 2006, in a 94–110 loss to the Denver Nuggets where he recorded 4 points in 4 minutes of playing time. Kasun averaged 2.7 points and 2.6 rebounds in a total of 73 games in his NBA career.

In July 2006 he returned to Europe again, signing with FC Barcelona and later in 2008 with Efes Pilsen.

In August 2010 he returned to Croatia and signed a one-year contract with KK Zagreb.

In August 2012 he signed a two-year contract with Montepaschi Siena. In December 2012, Kasun left the team for personal reasons. In September 2013, he signed with Al Wasl Dubai for the 2013–14 season.

In 2014 he had to play for Levski Sofia another two seasons before retiring, but the club president was arrested for tax evasions just as he was due to sign for the club, so he never played for them.

In February 2018 he played one match for KK Samobor, a regional division club from Croatia.

Euroleague career statistics

|-
| style="text-align:left;"| 2006–07
| style="text-align:left;"| FC Barcelona
| 8 || 7 || 15.9 || .569 || .000 || .875 || 4.3 || .5 || .4 || .5 || 11.9 || 12.1
|-
| style="text-align:left;"| 2007–08
| style="text-align:left;"| FC Barcelona
| 21 || 12 || 17.6 || .620 || .000 || .661 || 3.9 || .7 || .4 || .6 || 9.6 || 9.8
|-
| style="text-align:left;"| 2008–09
| style="text-align:left;"| Efes Pilsen
| 1 || 0 || 10.3 || .600 || .000 || .667 || 1.0 || .0 || .0 || .0 || 8.0 || 5.0
|-
| style="text-align:left;"| 2009–10
| style="text-align:left;"| Efes Pilsen
| 16 || 12 || 15.8 || .655 || .000 || .643 || 5.8 || .5 || .4 || .5 || 8.0 || 10.3
|-
| style="text-align:left;"| 2011–12
| style="text-align:left;"| KK Zagreb
| 9 || 9 || 25.1 || .536 || .000 || .800 || 6.6 || .9 || .7 || .9 || 12.2 || 13.3
|-
| style="text-align:left;"| 2012–13
| style="text-align:left;"| Montepaschi
| 8 || 4 || 10.9 || .500 || .000 || .556 || 4.0 || .3 || .4 || .6 || 5.0 || 5.6
|- class="sortbottom"
| style="text-align:left;"| Career
| style="text-align:left;"|
| 63 || 44 || 17.0 || .592 || .000 || .700 || 4.7 || .6 || .4 || .6 || 9.2 || 10.1

Croatian national team
Kasun was part of the Croatia national basketball team at EuroBasket 2005, EuroBasket 2007 and EuroBasket 2009. After a disappointing result for Croatia in the Eurobasket 2009, Mario Kasun announced his retirement from the national team with this words: "This was my last game for the national team. Every time I gave everything on the court, but it seems that is not enough. I need the summer to rest and not be injured. Obviously I am not stable in the head anymore."

Personal life

In a March 2005 interview with Inside Hoops, Kasun referred to Dražen Petrović as one of his favorite players and number one idol.

Kasun is famous for his tattoos, of which he has 30. He got his first when he was only 15.

His tattoos are mostly related with faith and his family. On his right forearm and wrist he has an angel and four letters: E, D, M and A. Those represent the first letter on the name of every member in his family: E for his sister "Eva", D for his father, "Drago" (angels, inner side of right biceps), M is meant for his own name, "Mario" and A for mother "Ankica" (right rib). On his back he has a big tattoo of another angel, which he describes as "watching my back".

References

External links
 NBA stats
 Euroleague.net profile
 Eurobasket.com profile
 ACB.com profile 

1980 births
Living people
ABA League players
Anadolu Efes S.K. players
Centers (basketball)
Croatian expatriate basketball people in Germany
Croatian expatriate basketball people in Spain
Croatian expatriate basketball people in the United States
Croatian men's basketball players
FC Barcelona Bàsquet players
KK Gorica players
KK Zagreb players
KK Zrinjevac players
Köln 99ers players
Liga ACB players
Los Angeles Clippers draft picks
Mens Sana Basket players
National Basketball Association players from Croatia
Orlando Magic players
Sportspeople from Vinkovci
Skyliners Frankfurt players